Anna Dessoye (born July 13, 1994) is a field hockey player from the United States, who plays as a midfielder.

Personal life
Anna Dessoye was born in Mountaintop, Pennsylvania. She began playing hockey in the sixth grade. She also uses a Ritual Hockey stick.

Dessoye is a former student of the University of Maryland, where she majored in Public Health.

Career

National teams

Under–21
In 2013, Dessoye was a member of the United States U–21 side at the Junior World Cup, where the team finished seventh.

Senior team
Anna Dessoye made her senior international debut for the United States national team in 2017, during a test series against New Zealand in Christchurch.

In 2019, Dessoye was a member of the national team during the inaugural edition of the FIH Pro League. Later that year, she participated in the 2019 Pan American Games in Lima. At the tournament, she received her first major medal for her country after defeating Chile for the bronze.

References

1994 births
Living people
American female field hockey players
Pan American Games bronze medalists for the United States
Pan American Games medalists in field hockey
Field hockey players at the 2019 Pan American Games
Sportspeople from Pennsylvania
People from Luzerne County, Pennsylvania
Medalists at the 2019 Pan American Games
21st-century American women